William Kirby (c. 1738 – after 1810) was an American pewtersmith active in New York City. 

Kirby's father was Peter Kirby, also a pewtersmith. He married Catherine Roosevelt on February 6, 1760, in New York City, where he worked from circa 1755-1790 as a pewtersmith. The 1786 city directory gives his address as 23 Dock Street, and he advertised on September 26, 1774, as follows in the New-York Gazette and The Weekly Mercury:

William Kirby, Pewterer, at the corner of Dock-street, near the Old Slip Market, and opposite the late corner-store of Gerardus Duyckinck, has just imported in the Earl of Dunmore, Capt. Lawrence, a large and general assortment of London pewter, which he will sell wholesale and retail, on the most reasonable terms, viz. Dishes, plates and basons; hard-metal water plates, tureens, tankards, quart and pint pots, teapots of different sorts and sizes; coffee, sugar, and milk pots; pint, 1/2 pint and gill porringers; soup, table and teaspoons; round-bowl spoons, soup ladles, quart and pint bowls, wash-hand basons, funnels, large chamber pots, close-stool and bed pans, measures from one gallon to half a gill, dram cups, round and square chest ink-stands, large and small crains.

Said Kirby has likewise just come to hand, a curious and general assortment of English and Dutch toys, which he will sell wholesale and retail, at a low advance, amongst which are, a few large humming tops, japan'd waiters, bread baskets, clothes and shoe brushes, hair brooms, hearth brushes, plated shoe and knee buckles, and a variety of other articles in the toy way, too tedious to mention.

He takes old pewter and bees-wax in exchange for new pewter.

His work is collected in the Metropolitan Museum of Art, Winterthur Museum, Garden and Library, and Yale University Art Gallery.

References 
 American Pewter: Garvan and Other Collections at Yale, Graham Hood, Yale University Art Gallery, 1965, 8, 37, 40, no. 146, ill.
 Pewter in America: Its Makers and Their Marks, Volume 3, Ledlie Irwin Laughlin, Barre Publishers, 1969, page 105.
 American Pewter, John Barrett Kerfoot, Houghton Mifflin, 1924, page 58.
 American Silversmiths entry
 Yale University Art Gallery porringer
 Metropolitan Museum of Art tankard

American metalsmiths